James Mullowney was a member of the Wisconsin State Assembly in 1878 and 1879. He was a Democrat. Additionally, he was a deputy sheriff and Undersheriff of Juneau County, Wisconsin. Mullowney was born on August 1, 1841 in Troy, New York.

References

Politicians from Troy, New York
People from Juneau County, Wisconsin
American deputy sheriffs
1841 births
Year of death missing
Democratic Party members of the Wisconsin State Assembly